Salsa Dura is an album by the American trombonist Jimmy Bosch, released in 1999. The title translates to "hard salsa", Bosch's descriptor for his music, and the style of salsa that was less popular than the salsa romántica of the 1990s. Bosch also named his band Salsa Dura.

Production
The album was produced by Bosch, Aaron Levinson, and Mark Bingham. Bosch wrote 10 of Salsa Dura'''s 12 tracks. "Speak No Evil" is a cover of the Wayne Shorter song. Steve Turre and Chucho Valdes played on the album. David Sanborn soloed on "Canta Mi Mozambique".

Critical receptionJazzTimes wrote that "it is Bosch’s trombone that brings out the character of the music: hot, yes, but not heavy, worldly and knowing, and ultimately engaging." The Orlando Sentinel thought that "Bosch is a first-rate writer ... he and his group of monster improvisers don't traffic in trite riffs or predictable arrangements." Jazziz deemed the album an "industrial strength variant of urbanized, AfroCuban-rooted dance music."

The Toronto Star noted that "Bosch filters son, plena, conga, descarga and bolero forms through a more muscular framework." The Sun-Sentinel'' stated that Bosch's "brand of salsa dura—the sound he created by returning salsa to its Afro-Cuban call-and-response roots, employing instrumental solos and improvisation—makes him one of Latin America's most dynamic bandleaders."

AllMusic called the album "a collection of salsa dance tunes, sescargas, boleros, mozambiques, plenas and guajiras with detailed arrangements and energetic playing from Bosch and his band."

Track listing

References

1999 albums
Rykodisc albums
Salsa albums